Pridacha Airport (also given as Repnoe, or Voronezh East)  is an airport in Russia located 5 km east of Voronezh.  It is home to the Voronezh Aircraft Plant (VASO).  The Tupolev Tu-144, Ilyushin Il-86, and Ilyushin Il-96 were built here.

Voronezh Pridacha is not open to the public and is used solely by VASO, no public access is allowed

References
RussianAirFields.com

Airports built in the Soviet Union
Airports in Voronezh Oblast